"Don't Walk Away" is a song by American R&B group Jade, released in November 1992 as the second single from their debut album, Jade to the Max (1992). It samples the drums from Kool & the Gang's 1975 song "Jungle Jazz" and the chords progression from Stevie Wonder's 1982 song "That Girl". The song peaked at number two on the US Billboard Hot R&B/Hip-Hop Songs chart and number four on the Billboard Hot 100. Outside of the United States, it also peaked within the top 10 in the United Kingdom, reaching number seven. The success of the single landed the trio spots on The Tonight Show, The Arsenio Hall Show, and Top of the Pops in the United Kingdom.

In 2017, Billboard ranked the song number 52 on their list of "100 Greatest Girl Group Songs of All Time". The bassline of the song was sampled by A Tribe Called Quest for the song "Award Tour", from the album Midnight Marauders. The first verse and chorus were interpolated in Diplo and Sleepy Tom's 2015 dance track "Be Right There".

Critical reception
William Cooper from AllMusic felt that the song is "so infectious and irresistible", adding that it "may be a familiar tune heard on the radio years after its success". Larry Flick from Billboard commented, "'I Wanna Love You' from the soundtrack to Class Act laid a fine foundation for this soft-yet-percussive midtempo romp. Charming female trio walks the stylistic line dividing En Vogue-ish urban flash and Exposé-esque pop flair. Catchy chorus ensures heavy multiformat radio action." 

In his weekly UK chart commentary, James Masterton said, "The cynic in me has the temptation to label this track as sanitised West coast production pop of the kind US FM radio is so enamoured with. Certainly all-girl groups of this particular genre never seem to make much of an impression over here, except it seems at this time of year. Predictions as to the future chart success of this one are divided but it is harmless and inoffensive enough to be an Easter hit." A reviewer from Music & Media noted, "Hot on the heels of En Vogue, this female vocal group is already top 10 in the UK. The beat gets any person out of their arm chair, and the lyrics could make a guy walk on clouds." Mark Kinchen for Music Weeks RM Dance Update wrote, "Jade just catches me with great harmonies in the chorus. The trio's great vocals are backed by a slamming hip hop style track. When you play this one, play it very loud!"

Music video
A music video was produced to promote the single. It begins with a group of men hanging out by their cars. One of them are using a car phone to call the group. Jade then performs the song as they dance on the sidewalk, while people around them are watching and/or dancing. Other scenes shows the group singing on a staircase in the locality. In the end, the girls are seen in one of the cars, as it slowly drives away.

Formats and track listings

 7-inch vinyl"Don't Walk Away" (Pop Walk)
"Don't Walk Away" (Album Walk)

 7" vinyl"Don't Walk Away"
"Looking For Me Do Right"

 12-inch vinyl"Don't Walk Away" (Album Walk)
"Don't Walk Away" (A Cappella Walk)
"Don't Walk Away" (Instrumental Walk)
"Don't Walk Away" (TV Walk)

 CD single"Don't Walk Away" (Pop Walk)
"Don't Walk Away" (Lite Walk)
"Don't Walk Away" (Dark Walk)
"Don't Walk Away" (Mack Daddy Stroll)
"Don't Walk Away" (Album Walk)

 Cassette single"Don't Walk Away" (Album Walk)
"Don't Walk Away" (Instrumental Walk)

Charts and certifications

Weekly charts

Year-end charts

Certifications

Release history

Javine version

"Don't Walk Away" was covered by British R&B singer Javine. It was released in the United Kingdom with "You've Got a Friend", a cover of the Carole King classic, as a B-side. The single peaked at number 16 on the UK Singles Chart.

Formats and track listings
 CD: 1 "Don't Walk Away" (album version)
 "You've Got a Friend"

 CD: 2'
 "Don't Walk Away" (album version)
 "Don't Walk Away" (Armand Van Helden club mix)
 "Don't Walk Away" (Soda Club edit)
 "Don't Walk Away" (Bad Boy remix)

Charts

Notes

1992 singles
1992 songs
2004 singles
Giant Records (Warner) singles
Jade (American group) songs
Javine songs
New jack swing songs
Songs written by Ronald Spearman
Songs written by Vassal Benford
Virgin Records singles